A Thousand Ships is a 2019 novel by Natalie Haynes which retells the mythology of the Trojan war from the perspective of the women involved.

Format
As a framing device, the muse Calliope narrates several stories from Greek mythology to an unidentified male poet. She introduces characters including Helen of Troy, Hecabe, Briseis, Oenone and Circe.

Reception
The novel was shortlisted for the 2020 Women's Prize for Fiction.

References

2019 British novels
Novels set during the Trojan War